Thicketty Mountain Ore Pits (38CK74) is a historic archaeological site located near Shady Grove Church, Cherokee County, South Carolina.  The site includes iron ore pits associated with the South Carolina Manufacturing Company, a major iron manufacturing company that operated in Spartanburg County between about 1825 and about 1850. The iron ore pits or surface mines cover several forested acres along a gently sloping ridge and are generally depressions about two to three meters deep and about five to ten meters across. The pits were last operational in the 1850s.

It was listed in the National Register of Historic Places in 1987.

References

Archaeological sites on the National Register of Historic Places in South Carolina
National Register of Historic Places in Cherokee County, South Carolina